The 2015 Sepang 12 Hours was the 16th Sepang 12 Hours race held on Sepang International Circuit on 12 December 2015. The race was contested with GT3-spec cars, GTC-spec cars, GT4-spec cars and touring cars. This was the first Sepang 12 Hours race organized by the Stéphane Ratel Organisation (SRO).

Report

Paid Practice sessions

Free Practice sessions

Qualifying
Pole position was taken by car #1, Clearwater Racing, with a time of 2:02.768.

Race

Event format

Entry list

Race result
Class winners in bold.

See also
Sepang 12 Hours
Sepang International Circuit

Notes

References

External links

Sepang 12 Hours